Marcello Sereni (born 24 July 1996) is an Italian professional footballer who plays as a winger for  club Fiorenzuola on loan from Rimini.

Club career
Sereni was formed on Sassuolo youth system. For the 2015–16 season, he was loaned to Parma, and made his senior debut in Serie D.

In 2016, he left Sassuolo and signed for Castelvetro Calcio on Serie D.

After five seasons in Serie D, on 8 September 2020, he signed with Serie C club Ravenna. Sereni made his professional debut on 27 September 2020 against Südtirol.

He played one season for Ravenna. On 1 August 2021, he joined Ancona-Matelica.

On 12 July 2022, he moved to Rimini. On 18 January 2023, Sereni was loaned to Fiorenzuola for the rest of the season.

References

External links
 
 

1996 births
Living people
Sportspeople from Modena
Footballers from Emilia-Romagna
Italian footballers
Association football wingers
Serie C players
Serie D players
U.S. Sassuolo Calcio players
Parma Calcio 1913 players
S.S.D. Correggese Calcio 1948 players
A.S.D. Mezzolara players
Ravenna F.C. players
Ancona-Matelica players
Rimini F.C. 1912 players
U.S. Fiorenzuola 1922 S.S. players